Laurence Guillou (born 1 October 1969) is a French swimmer. She competed in two events at the 1988 Summer Olympics.

References

External links
 

1969 births
Living people
French female backstroke swimmers
Olympic swimmers of France
Swimmers at the 1988 Summer Olympics
Sportspeople from Bordeaux